The Brockville Football Club was a team that played in the QRFU at the turn of the 20th century.  They had great success early on in their history. In 1899, they finished in first place in the QRFU but lost to Ottawa College in the Quebec finals. They won the QRFU Championship in 1900 but lost in the Dominion Final to the Ottawa Rough Riders.

QRFU season-by-season

References

Quebec Rugby Football Union teams
Canadian football teams in Ontario
Defunct Canadian football teams
Sport in Brockville
1899 establishments in Ontario
Sports clubs established in 1899
1902 disestablishments in Ontario
Sports clubs disestablished in 1902